The 1990 Tirreno–Adriatico was the 25th edition of the Tirreno–Adriatico cycle race and was held from 7 March to 14 March 1990. The race started in Bacoli and finished in San Benedetto del Tronto. The race was won by Tony Rominger of the Chateau d'Ax team.

General classification

References

1990
1990 in Italian sport